Luca Dirisio (born in Vasto, June 18, 1978) is an Italian singer.

Early life
Luca was born to Cecelia and Luigi Dirisio, on June 18, 1978, in Vasto. Before starting singing, he was a promising player in the Italian youth soccer league, although late in his young career he broke his right femur during a match.

Music career
His first single "Calma e sangue freddo" was published during the summer of 2004 in Italy and immediately became a hit. His first album, Luca Dirisio, sold more than 100,000 copies. The next singles extracted from this album were "Il mio amico vende il te", "Usami" and "Per sempre". During the summer, Luca started a long series of concerts in Italy. Recently, he won a prize to be "the revelation of the year" at an Italian music contest Festivalbar.

In 2006, while the album Luca Dirisio and the single "Calma e Sangue Freddo" were published in Germany, Spain and Mexico, he participated 56th Sanremo Music Festival with a new song "Sparirò", written by himself and dedicated to an ex-girlfriend. Just after the festival, Luca's second album arrived in shops La vita è strana, which contains the Festival song. In the summer of 2006 the second extracted single was "La Ricetta del Campione", and the third one "L'Isola degli Sfigati". In the videoclip of "L'Isola degli Sfigati", Luca makes fun of the RAI show L'Isola dei Famosi, the Italian version of CBS show Survivor.

In September 2006, Luca was chosen to sing "Se Provi a Volare", the Italian adaptation of "Breaking Free", main theme of Disney High School Musical. This song was later inserted in the reprints of La Vita è Strana.

Discography

Album

Singles

1978 births
Living people
People from Vasto
21st-century Italian male singers